Rosario Costantino (born 4 March 1997) is an Italian football player who plays for SC Palazzolo.

Club career
He made his Serie C debut for Gubbio on 22 October 2016 in a game against Ancona.

In October 2019, Costantino joined SC Palazzolo.

References

External links
 

1997 births
Footballers from Palermo
Living people
Italian footballers
A.S. Gubbio 1910 players
Alma Juventus Fano 1906 players
A.S.D. S.C. Palazzolo players
Serie C players
Association football midfielders